The Glogovac Monastery is a Serbian Orthodox monastery dedicated to Saint George and located at the village of Babići near Šipovo in the Republika Srpska entity of Bosnia and Herzegovina. It is the only monastery in this area. The original building was destroyed in 1463 when this region was occupied by Ottoman Turks.

First reconstruction
Omer-paša Latas started reconstructing this monastery by building a church in 1867. Bishop Dionisije Milijević put this church into operation in 1869. According to one of the stories, enslaved Serbs asked the Sultan of Turkey to allow them to re-build this holy place. Permission was granted under condition that church bells were not heard. This is the reason the monastery is built between steep hills.

Second reconstruction
Glogovac is the spiritual focal point for this area. Seventy five years after the monastery was re-built it was destroyed again. This time it was done by the Ustaše and this happened on October 14, 1944. Around 1960, the monastery was sufficiently re-built to be used as a parish church. In 1999, complete reconstruction was started and it was finished in 2005. Left of the main building, work on building St. George's camp has started. Another project underway is the finishing of a building for pilgrims.

References

Serbian Orthodox monasteries in Bosnia and Herzegovina
14th-century Serbian Orthodox church buildings
Buildings and structures in Republika Srpska
Šipovo
Nemanjić dynasty endowments
14th-century establishments in Bosnia and Herzegovina
Christian monasteries established in the 14th century
Medieval sites in Bosnia and Herzegovina